BGM can refer to:

Locations
Boddington Gold Mine, a gold mine in Western Australia.

Mathematics
Bayesian Graphical Model, a form of probability model.
Brace Gatarek Musiela LIBOR market model: a finance model, also called BGM in reference to some of its inventors

Medicine
Blood glucose monitoring, or the device used to monitor blood glucose levels

Music
Background music
BGM (album), 1981 album by Yellow Magic Orchestra
Bonnier Gazell Music 
BGM (song), track on 2019 Wale album Wow... That's Crazy
Blackpool Grime Media, a controversial grime channel

Transport
Bellingham railway station serving London, England (National Rail station code: BGM)
Greater Binghamton Airport serving Binghamton, New York (IATA Code: BGM)

Other
an abbreviation for the former Bell Globemedia, now Bell Media
The US Military designation for a surface attack guided missile with multiple launch environments
 BGM-71 TOW missile
 BGM-109 Tomahawk missile